Bella Ferraro (born 1994) is an Australian singer most notable for finishing fourth on the fourth season of The X Factor Australia in 2012.

Early life
Ferraro was born and raised in Sydney, Australia. She began singing as a child. At age five, she became a member of the Australian Girls Choir, who have performed at the annual Carols in the Domain and during Oprah Winfrey's Australian tour. Ferraro left school in Year 12 to pursue a music career.

Career

2012: The X Factor Australia
Ferraro successfully auditioned for the fourth season of The X Factor in 2012, singing "Skinny Love", with a treatment based on the version by Birdy. She was inspired to audition for the show after seeing the success of One Direction on the UK version. During the super bootcamp stage, Ferraro forgot the lyrics to the two songs she performed: Gotye's "Somebody That I Used to Know" and Crowded House's "Don't Dream It's Over". For the first live performance show on 17 September 2012, Ferraro sang Matt Corby's "Brother" and received a mixed response from the judges. Mel B said it was not the right song choice, while Ronan Keating disagreed saying that he loved the song choice and describing her performance as "beautiful".

For the second live performance show, Ferraro performed a stripped back version of "What Makes You Beautiful". She received mixed reviews from the judges, who concluded that while the song was an appropriate choice, the arrangement did not match that week's theme, "Party Week". Her performance of "What Makes You Beautiful" debuted at number 62 on the ARIA Singles Chart. For the third live performance show, she sang "Big Yellow Taxi" by Joni Mitchell and received a positive response from the judges for her vocals, but mixed reviews over the choreography incorporated into the performance. Keating said the vocals were great but the dancing came in and it wasn't. Ferraro's performance of "Big Yellow Taxi" debuted at number 84. For the fourth live show, she sang "Ray of Light" by Madonna followed by the English version of "99 Red Balloons" from German band Nena for the fifth live show. In week six of the live shows, Ferraro fell into the bottom two alongside Fourtunate but was saved after Mel B, Natalie Bassingthwaighte, and Guy Sebastian all opted to eliminate Fourtunate.

For the seventh live performance show, Ferraro sang The Temper Trap's "Sweet Disposition". Her performance of "Sweet Disposition" debuted at number 59. For the eighth live performance show, Ferraro sang "Dreams" by The Cranberries, and her performance debuted at number 82. In the semi-finals of the live shows, Ferraro fell into the bottom two alongside The Collective; the result was a deadlock and so reverted to the earlier public vote. Ferraro was eliminated and thus placed fourth in the competition. Her performance of "The Last Day on Earth" debuted at number 90.

Performances on The X Factor
 denotes having reached the ARIA Singles Chart. denotes having been in the bottom two.

2012–2013: Record deal and singles
After The X Factor ended, Ferraro obtained a recording contract with Sony Music Australia and released her debut single "Set Me on Fire" on 14 December 2012. The song peaked at number 36 on the ARIA Singles Chart on 30 December 2012. Her second single "Forgot You", which features Will Singe of The Collective, was released on 18 October 2013 and peaked at number 75 on the ARIA Singles Chart.

2014: Leaving Sony Music & Social Media 
Bella opted out of her recording contract & abandoned all social media in 2014. Ferraro is no longer signed to Sony Music Australia.

2015-2019: Life away from the spotlight, LilBels 
Over the coming years, Bella studied music production, did backing vocals, keyboards & even performed on occasion under the name 'LilBels' Bella performed as LilBels in Sydney with band Sister Peach where she was rediscovered by artist Zepha, a turning point for Bella's return to music.

2020-Present: Returning as Bella Ferraro, new single 
Bella performed at the iconic Sydney venue, Low 302, where she played unreleased tracks that were recently finalized with friend & artist Zepha. After the positive response Bella decided to release a single titled 'Her' that was released in August 2020. The single would be part of an upcoming EP. Dave Ruby Howe from Triple j Unearthed had this to say about the single "Bella's vocal and this whole pulsing track does more than just luring you in. It's more like they trap you. Everything feels close up and connected; skin to skin, baring the soul." Bella released her second single from the upcoming EP "Believe You" on 30 October 2020

Artistry
Ferraro cites Bon Iver, Lykke Li, Crystal Castles, Foals and Two Door Cinema Club as her musical influences.

Discography

Singles

Other charted songs

References

External links
 (Archive)

https://www.bellaferraromusic.com/

Australian people of Italian descent
The X Factor (Australian TV series) contestants
Living people
Musicians from Sydney
1994 births
21st-century Australian singers
21st-century Australian women singers